Lamellisphecia is a genus of moths in the family Sesiidae.

Species
Lamellisphecia champaensis Kallies & Arita, 2004
Lamellisphecia haematinea Kallies & Arita, 2004
Lamellisphecia sumatrana Fischer, 2005
Lamellisphecia wiangensis Kallies & Arita, 2004

References

Sesiidae